Puya valida is a species in the genus Puya. This species is endemic to Bolivia. Its scientific name is Puya valida L.B.Sm.

References

valida
Flora of Bolivia